Pellegrino Bellezze (born 10 Jan 1884 in São José dos Campos) was a Brazilian clergyman and bishop for the Roman Catholic Diocese of Manzini. He was ordained in 1907. He was appointed in 1923. He died in 1961.

References 

Brazilian Roman Catholic bishops
1884 births
1961 deaths